The Barre Falls Dam is located on the Ware River in Barre, Massachusetts, about  below the junction of the river's east and west branches and  northwest of Worcester, Massachusetts.

Designed and constructed by the United States Army Corps of Engineers, this dam substantially reduces flooding along the Ware, Chicopee, and Connecticut rivers. Construction of the project began in May 1956 with completion in July 1958 at a cost of US$2 million.

The Barre Falls reservoir is located within the Upper Ware River Watershed and is part of the Chicopee River Watershed. Access to the site is available from Route 62.

Description

Cut in rock, the spillway comprises a concrete weir . in length. The weir's crest elevation is  lower than the top of the dam. There is no lake at the Barre Falls Dam.

Management
The Massachusetts Department of Conservation and Recreation manage and preserve the land for water quality protection. The Massachusetts Water Resources Authority manages these water resources, which are part of the public water supply for the Greater Boston area. The Corps assists the MWRA by coordinating flows to maximize diversion rates, and the MWRA assists the Corps when requested to divert excess flows to help with flood control. Camping, swimming and wading are not permitted. However, there is an 18-hole disc golf course which spans much of the premises.

References 
 Barre Falls Dam specifications
 MWRA Wachusett Reservoir History
 Mass Central Rail Trail. Rails To Trails conversion on the Central Mass line, which was rerouted during dam construction
 Court order and statement of facts about MWRA facilities

Dams in Massachusetts
Buildings and structures in Barre, Massachusetts
United States Army Corps of Engineers dams
Dams completed in 1959